The 1940 Arizona gubernatorial election took place on November 5, 1940. Incumbent Governor Robert Taylor Jones ran for reelection but was defeated in the Democratic primary by former Secretary of State Sidney Preston Osborn, whom Jones had previously defeated in 1938.

Sidney Preston Osborn defeated Jerrie W. Lee in the general election, and was sworn into his first term as Governor on January 6, 1941, becoming Arizona's seventh Governor.

Democratic primary
The Democratic primary took place on September 10, 1940. Incumbent Governor Robert Taylor Jones ran for reelection, but he was defeated by former Secretary of State Sidney Preston Osborn. Osborn previously ran against Jones in 1938, but was defeated due to the race being a three-way with Secretary of State James H. Kerby. C. M. Menderson, Ernest Carleton, George E. Shields, and Howard Sprouse also ran but presented only token opposition.

Candidates
 Robert Taylor Jones, incumbent Governor
 Sidney P. Osborn, former Secretary of State of Arizona
 C. M. Menderson
 Ernest Carleton
 George E. Shields
 Howard Sprouse, state legislator

Results

Republican primary

Candidates
 Jerrie W. Lee, 1938 Republican gubernatorial nominee

General election

References

1940
1940 United States gubernatorial elections
Gubernatorial
November 1940 events